The Last Frontier is the official state nickname of Alaska. It may also refer to:

Film and television
 The Last Frontier (miniseries), a 1986 American television miniseries
 The Last Frontier (serial), a 1932 American film serial starring Lon Chaney, Jr
 The Last Frontier (TV series), a 1996 American sitcom
 The Last Frontier (1926 film), a Western by George B. Seitz
 The Last Frontier (1955 film), a Western by Anthony Mann
 The Last Frontier (2020 film), a Russian war film
 The Last Frontier, a 1974 TV special produced by Roger Ailes

Literature
 The Last Frontier (novel), by Alistair MacLean
 The Last Frontier, a novel by Howard Fast
 The Last Frontier – Australia Wide, a book by photographer Ken Duncan

Music
 "The Last Frontier", a song by Redgum from Brown Rice and Kerosine
 "The Last Frontier", a song by Highway 101 from The New Frontier

Other uses
 Antarctica, at times referred to as "the last frontier"
 New Frontier Hotel and Casino, which from 1942 to 1955 was named Hotel Last Frontier
 Scientific research into the human brain is at times referred to as "the last frontier"
 Planet of the Apes: Last Frontier, a 2017 video game prelude to the film War for the Planet of the Apes

See also
 
 
 Alaska: The Last Frontier, 2011 Discovery Channel TV series
 Final Frontier (disambiguation)